Wijs is a Dutch surname that may refer to the following notable people:
J.J.A. Wijs (1864–1942), Dutch chemist, known for Wijs solution and Wijs/ Hanuš method
Jordy de Wijs (born 1995), Dutch football player

Dutch-language surnames